Edward Nally may refer to:
Edward Julian Nally (1859–1953), American radio industrialist
Edward Nally (solicitor), English solicitor, former President of the Law Society